Estero Llano Grande State Park is located  south of the city of Weslaco in  Hidalgo County in the U.S. state of Texas.

Background
The land where the parks sits was part of the Llano Grande Land Grant granted to Juan José Hinojosa in 1776 by Charles IV of Spain. In early 2000, the state of Texas pieced together the current park from a variety of separate parcels.

The Arroyo Colorado and Llano Grande Lake border the park on the south.

See also

Museums in South Texas
National Register of Historic Places listings in Hidalgo County, Texas

References

External links
TPWD: official Estero Llano Grande State Park website

State parks of Texas
Nature centers in Texas
Protected areas of Hidalgo County, Texas
Lower Rio Grande Valley